The 2018 Kansas City Chiefs season was the franchise's 49th season in the National Football League, their 59th overall, their sixth under head coach Andy Reid, and their second under general manager Brett Veach. The Chiefs finished 12–4 and won their third consecutive AFC West title, made their fourth consecutive playoff appearance, but lost to the eventual Super Bowl champion New England Patriots in the AFC Championship. Quarterback Patrick Mahomes won the AP NFL MVP award, becoming the first Chiefs player to ever be named MVP.

Season summary
In the offseason the Chiefs had several major changes, including trading 2-time Pro Bowler Marcus Peters, as well as Alex Smith. The team also voided the final year of the contract of their longest tenured player Derrick Johnson and they released long time linebacker Tamba Hali.

Under first year starting quarterback Patrick Mahomes, the Chiefs would start the season 5–0 for the second consecutive year before losing to the New England Patriots. The Chiefs then won their next four games before losing again to the Los Angeles Rams. A Week 14 win over the Baltimore Ravens clinched the Chiefs' fourth consecutive playoff appearance. After defeating their rival, the Oakland Raiders 35–3 in Week 17, the Chiefs clinched their third consecutive division title and home-field advantage throughout the playoffs for the first time since 1997.

In the playoffs, the Chiefs advanced to the AFC Championship Game for the first time since 1993 by defeating the Indianapolis Colts, 31–13 in the Divisional round.  This win ended the Chiefs' 6-game home playoff losing streak dating back to 1993. It was only the Chiefs' second win in their last 13 playoff games. In the AFC Championship Game, the Chiefs lost to the eventual Super Bowl champion New England Patriots, 37–31 in overtime. Two days after the loss, defensive coordinator Bob Sutton was fired following multiple NFL analysts criticizing his lack of adjustments in the AFC Championship Game, as well as other games throughout the season.

NFL Top 100
The Chiefs had three players ranked in NFL Network's annual Top 100 players countdown, the fewest the team has had on the list since 2012.

Draft

Trades

 The Chiefs traded their first round selection (No. 22 overall), along with their 2017 first and third round selections to the Buffalo Bills in exchange for the Bills' 2017 first-round selection.
 The Chiefs received a third round selection (No. 78 overall) and cornerback Kendall Fuller from the Washington Redskins in exchange for quarterback Alex Smith.
 The Chiefs traded their fifth round selection (159th overall) to the Cleveland Browns in exchange for offensive tackle Cameron Erving.
 The Chiefs traded their seventh round selection (240th overall) to the San Francisco 49ers in exchange for cornerback Kenneth Acker.
 The Chiefs received a seventh round draft selection (233rd overall) from the Arizona Cardinals in exchange for cornerback Marcus Cooper.
 The Chiefs traded cornerback Marcus Peters and their sixth round selection (209th overall, a compensatory pick) to the Los Angeles Rams for their fourth round selection (124th overall) and their second round selection in the 2019 NFL Draft.
 The Chiefs received a seventh round draft selection (243rd Overall) from the Tennessee Titans in exchange for defensive tackle David King.
 The Chiefs received a 2nd round pick (46th overall) and a 3rd round pick (100th overall) from the Cincinnati Bengals in exchange for the Chiefs' 2nd round pick (54th overall) and 3rd round pick (78th overall).
 The Chiefs received a 3rd round pick (75th overall) from the Baltimore Ravens in exchange for their 3rd round pick (86th overall) and their 4th round pick (122nd overall)
 The Chiefs received a 6th round pick (198th overall) from the New England Patriots in exchange for two 7th round picks (233rd overall and 243rd Overall)

Staff

Final roster

Preseason

Regular season

Schedule

Notes
 Intra-division opponents are in bold text.
 The Week 11 game against the Los Angeles Rams was originally scheduled to be played in Mexico City in Estadio Azteca as a part of the league's International Series, but was moved to Los Angeles due to concerns over the playing surface.

Game summaries

Week 1: at Los Angeles Chargers

Week 2: at Pittsburgh Steelers

Week 3: vs. San Francisco 49ers

Week 4: at Denver Broncos

Week 5: vs. Jacksonville Jaguars

Week 6: at New England Patriots

Week 7: vs. Cincinnati Bengals

Week 8: vs. Denver Broncos
With this win, head coach Andy Reid eclipsed win number 200, becoming the seventh coach in NFL history to do so (with Don Shula, George Halas, Bill Belichick, Tom Landry, Curly Lambeau, & Marty Schottenheimer).

Week 9: at Cleveland Browns
With this win, head coach Andy Reid won his 201st regular season game, passing Marty Schottenheimer to move to 6th most regular season wins in NFL history.

Week 10: vs. Arizona Cardinals

Week 11: at Los Angeles Rams

Week 13: at Oakland Raiders

Week 14: vs. Baltimore Ravens

Week 15: vs. Los Angeles Chargers

Week 16: at Seattle Seahawks

Week 17: vs. Oakland Raiders

With this win, head coach Andy Reid won his 206th combined regular season & post season game, passing Marty Schottenheimer to move to 7th most combined wins in NFL history.

Standings

Division

Conference

Postseason

Schedule

Game summaries

AFC Divisional Playoffs: vs. (6) Indianapolis Colts

AFC Championship: vs. (2) New England Patriots

References

External links
 

Kansas City
Kansas City Chiefs seasons
Kansas City Chiefs
AFC West championship seasons